Piratas is a Spanish adventure drama television series with comedy elements created by Carlos Portela and which stars Óscar Jaenada, Pilar Rubio and Silvia Abascal. It aired on Telecinco in 2011.

Premise 
Set in the 18th century, the fiction follows the exploits of Álvaro Mondego (Óscar Jaenada), a member of the nobility who ends up captured by a pirate crew led by Captain Bocanegra (Aitor Mazo) and his daughter Carmen (Pilar Rubio).

Cast 
 Óscar Jaenada as Álvaro Mondego.
 Pilar Rubio as Carmen Bocanegra.
 Silvia Abascal as Blanca Díaz de Andrade, Marquise of Toro.
  as Esteban Yáñez de Oliveira.
  as Captain Bocanegra.
  as Victoria Falcón.
 Luis Zahera as Puñales.
 Áxel Fernández as Antón Velasco.
  as Rodrigo Malvar.
 Babou Cham as Aymán Kadar.
  as Fosco.
  as Intendant Gaspar Falcón.
  as Doña Beatriz Jiménez de Vicuña.

Production and release 
Created by Carlos Portela, Piratas was produced by Telecinco in collaboration with Mandarina. Jorge Coira and Jorge Saavedra directed the episodes. Filming began in August 2010 in Galicia. The series premiered on 9 May 2011. The first episode earned good viewership ratings (3,454,000 viewers and 17.2% share) and led the prime time slot. However interested rapidly waned and the series ended its broadcasting run on 27 June 2011 with only a 10.3% audience share, averaging 2,027,000 viewers and a 11.9% audience share across the 8 episodes. The episodes' release time was also progressively delayed by the channel.

References 

2010s Spanish drama television series
Spanish adventure television series
2011 Spanish television series debuts
2011 Spanish television series endings
Spanish-language television shows
Television shows filmed in Spain
Television series set in the 18th century
Television series about pirates
Telecinco network series
Television series by Producciones Mandarina